Truesdale Hospital is a historic former hospital building located at 1820 Highland Avenue in Fall River, Massachusetts. It was built in 1920 and added to the National Register of Historic Places in 1986. It has since been converted into apartments, known as The Highlands.

History
The hospital was founded by Dr. Philemon E. Truesdale in 1905. It was originally located in the former First Baptist Church parsonage, on the corner of Winter and Pine Streets in Fall River.

The new Truesdale Hospital was built in 1912. A south wing was added in 1923, increasing bed capacity to one hundred. A new surgical wing was added in 1927, with a gift from Earle P. Charlton. In 1980, Truesdale Hospital merged with Union Hospital and was renamed Charlton Memorial Hospital.

The hospital also established a nursing school in 1912, which graduated its first class in 1915. Students were required to live in a residence on the hospital grounds. The nursing school closed in 1972.

The Truesdale Hospital Clinic was previously located on Rock Street in Fall River. This building is still standing, and is now part of the Lower Highlands Historic District.

See also
National Register of Historic Places listings in Fall River, Massachusetts

References

Hospital buildings completed in 1912
Hospital buildings completed in 1920
Hospitals in Bristol County, Massachusetts
Hospital buildings on the National Register of Historic Places in Massachusetts
Buildings and structures in Fall River, Massachusetts
Defunct hospitals in Massachusetts
National Register of Historic Places in Fall River, Massachusetts
1905 establishments in Massachusetts